Dandupalya is a 2012 Indian Kannada-language crime film, starring Pooja Gandhi and Raghu Mukherjee. The plot is based on the real-life exploits of a notorious gang named 'Dandupalya'. The film was directed by Srinivas Raju and produced by Girish under the Apple Blossom Creations banner. It was a major commercial success as it became one of the highest-grossing films in Kannada film industry, being shown for more than 100-days in multiple centres.

A sequel to the film Dandupalya 2, was announced in July 2014, and began production on 24 March 2016. Srinivas Raju directed the film. It was released on July 14, 2017, to decent reviews by critics. Again Pooja Gandhi played the main character in this film. Arjun Janya was the music director and the cinematography was handled by Venkat Prasad.

Dandupalya 3 was shot simultaneously, with part 2 having the almost same cast. Part 3 was to be released within a month of part 2.

Special Note 
The names used for the gang members in the movie have not been used in the plot to not hurt the sentiments.

Plot 
The scene opens with the gang killing a pig for food. One SI comes for them to kill a man in chittoor, A.P. They agree for a mere 3000 rupees. They kill the man, who turns out to be another police man, by slitting his throat. They join as construction workers with the recommendations of a woman (Pooja Gandhi), where she  works. The gang then begin the crime. They spot a home with a lone woman and follow a peculiar pattern: The woman asks for a glass of water to the lone  woman in the house and the rest of the gang force enter the home, rape and murder her by slitting the throat, finally stealing the home. In a parallel note, a man living with his sister agrees to marry a girl. They get married and girl gets pregnant but the girl and the man's sister are rape-murdered in a similar style. The man commits suicide by slitting his hand. The gang often get jobs from a corrupt lawyer to commit crimes for him for a small amount.

Inspector Chalapathi is a hard and intelligent cop who does not tolerate crime, especially towards women. The rape-murder-theft continues and it brings considerable pressure on him by seniors and frustrates him as the gang often do not leave a single trace of evidence. He then comes across the case of the man's pregnant wife and sister and from the pattern of killing by throat slitting, he deducts that it is a  psycho killing unlike conventional murders. He alerts all the informers of suspicious jewellery selling in local shops. One day, he comes across a case of stealing ornaments of Goddess Durga. From a tip off by informant, he catches the squint-eyed gang member selling the stolen jewellery. The temple's priest recognizes Lord Kartikeya's vel and informs the police that it is not Goddess Durga Devi's. The Initial suspect of him being a petty criminal makes Chalapathi believe that he is a part of Dandupalyam gang.The squint-eyed takes the police to a sleeping gang member (Ravi Kale/Chander in Sarkar movie). The squinted, chander and the inspector go to Lord Kartikeya's temple where previously His ornaments were also stolen and the two male priests were raped and murdered by slitting their throats. The squint eye explains how they stole ornaments without his awareness of the other gang members raping and killing the priests. Chalapathi deduces that they are the gang he is looking for.

The woman gang member spots them in the police station they are kept and the gang go to the corrupt lawyer for help. The lawyer sends habeas corpus writ to Chalapathi. Chalapathi now conforms that they are indeed a part of Dandupalyam gang as no arrest of common migrant construction worker attracts the writ. He locates the other gang members and with his senior's permission, he takes them to a secluded place for 40 days to get information but they do not speak even after unbearable torture. When the inspector starves them, they finally speak up and agree to their crimes.

Chalapathi takes them to court, the corrupt lawyer being their defense. The judge is provided with missing ornaments and a rape victim woman, who miraculously survives the rape, speaks as witness. The judge sentences the gang with Chalapathi concluding what follows will be shown in Dandupalya 2.

Cast

Production
Pooja Gandhi was asked to do the female lead in this film as Lakshmi, is a leader of an infamous notorious gang. Reluctantly she agreed to do the role, because of potential negative talk in Kannada film industry resulting in loss of her image portraying such characters.

Controversy 
The film was criticised by social group Bahujan Samaj Horata Samiti, who claimed that its content was offensive. They objected specifically to the film's portrayal of women. Further controversy followed when it was revealed that actress Pooja Gandhi would appear topless in the film.

After the release of the movie, Ambedkar Kranthi Sena activists demonstrated in Bengaluru against the film's "glorification of anti-social activities".

"According to the dictionary, nudity means that you are not covered with a single item of clothing from head to toe. But in this scene, I have worn a sari and I am trying to cover my body, except for my back".
says Gandhi about her controversial scene in the film

Soundtrack

Release
The film was certified an "A" by the Central Board of Film Certification. It was released across Karnataka on 29 June 2012
with the title name as Dandupalya. However, the Telugu and Tamil versions were released one year later, on 25 Jan 2013 and 24 May 2014 respectively.

Gandhi received several awards for her performance as Lakshmi.

Critical reception

Kannada version

A critic from The Times of India scored the film at 3 out of 5 stars and says "Pooja Gandhi walks away with full honours for her excellentperformance as Lakshmi. Makarand Deshapande is amazing. Ravi Kale is brilliant. Ravishankar gives life to his role of police inspector. Music by Arjun Janya and cinematography by Venkat Prasad are added attractions". Srikanth Srinivasa from Rediff.com scored the film at 3 out of 5 stars and wrote "Dandupalya is a spine chilling film that allows you to rewind your memories of the gang that terrorized society some time back. It is horrifying and gory. Go for it to know how the gang operated". Shruti I. L from DNA wrote "miss out on Pooja’s performance or to find out how this notorious gang was caught by the daring police inspector, Chalapathi. And if you already have watched it, well you now have the sequel to look forward to... Verdict: Watch it for Pooja Gandhi’s performance". A critic from News18 India wrote "but it is Markand Deshpande and Jai Dev who have come out with flying colours. Raghu Mukherjee, Nisha Kothari and Sudharani have filled in their roles adequately. The dialogues are crisp and to the point". B S Srivani from Deccan Herald wrote "Repeats of the gang’s forays, still portraying the police as mean weaklings and the incoherent courtroom dialogue culminating in an ominous climax — take your pick, but Dandupalya doesn’t rise above ribald jokes on wary neighbours and scheming strangers. With a sequel in the offing, more misery is promised". Y. Sunita Chowdhary from The Hindu wrote "Over all it is a well-made film technically but one would still wonder if the subject though universal still has a title and content pertaining to Karnataka, would interest the people in Andhra Pradesh. Good effort by Srinivas Raju who succeeds in drawing attention through his first film which is dubbed from Kannada". A critic from Bangalore Mirror wrote  "Dandupalya could have been a gripping crime saga, but it just turns out to be an average tale. If you are game for gore of the voyeuristic kind, go for it. Raju has promised a sequel. Hopefully, it will have more art than fake blood".

Tamil version
Business Standard, Sify.com, News18 India and India TV wrote ""Karimedu" is powered by some stellar performances. Pooja Gandhi as the leader of the gang is brilliant and extremely confident in her role. While some may typecast her performance as cheap and unwelcoming, I believe it takes guts for a regular heroine to shed her image and agree to play such a gritty part. She definitely deserves special mention for proving cliches wrong".

Box office and performance

The film, along with its dubbed versions collected over 25 crore domestically against a production budget of 3 crore, and went on to cross over 100-days in multiple centres.

Andhra Pradesh
The film was dubbed in Telugu and released as Dandupalyam. It was well received in Andhra Pradesh. The film Danduplya dubbed version titled under Dandupalyam was released with 110 prints and completed a successful 100-days run at "Guntur" and "Ongole" in AP/Telangana.

Tamil Nadu
A Tamil dub titled Karimedu was produced by Rama Narayanan's Sri Thenandal Films and released on 24 May 2013. The film received critical acclaim from the critics and audience upon the release.The movie had a re-release on 3 September 2021.

Sequels
A sequel to the film was announced in July 2014. Part Dandupalya 2 began production on 24 March 2016, and it was released on July 14, 2017. Srinivas Raju directed the film, which again stars Pooja Gandhi. Arjun Janya was the music director and the cinematography was performed by Venkat Prasad.

The film Dandupalya 3 was shot simultaneously during the Part 2 filming, while the second schedule of shooting was held from April 2017. Initially planned to release within a week after the Part 2 release, the film however, was pushed to release on 2 March 2018.

Trivia
The film brought instant fame to Makarand Deshpande in Kannada film industry, and also he was nominated for 2nd South Indian International Movie Award and
Bangalore Times Film Award for best actor in a negative role for his performance in the film as Krishna.

Awards and nominations

Awards

See also
 Dandupalya 2
Dandupalya 3
Dandupalya 4

References

External links 
 

2012 films
2010s Kannada-language films
Indian serial killer films
Indian crime thriller films
Films scored by Arjun Janya
Indian films based on actual events
2012 directorial debut films
2012 crime thriller films
2010s serial killer films